Walter Wolf (born 5 October 1939) is a Canadian oil-drilling equipment supplier who in the early 1970s made a fortune from the North Sea oil business and decided to join the world of Formula One (F1) motor racing.

Life and career

Wolf was born in Maribor, Slovenia. His mother was a half Slovene, half Austrian from Lower Styria, while his father was a German from Reutlingen. Wolf spent his childhood in his birthtown Maribor, Slovenia, then a republic of Yugoslavia. After his father returned from a Soviet military internment camp in 1954, the family moved to Wuppertal in West Germany. In 1958, they moved to Canada.

In Canada, Wolf became a renowned businessman. At first, his funds helped prop up Frank Williams' fledgling F1 team before Williams left in 1977 to form Williams Grand Prix Engineering. Wolf's team continued as Walter Wolf Racing and before being wound up in 1979 managed to win three F1 Grands Prix.

In 1993, Wolf helped finance the unsuccessful American fire apparatus company Firewolf Industries, housed in a former Piper Aircraft factory building near Lakeland, Florida, US.  The actor and vintage car collector L. Christian Mixon worked as a sales manager for this company briefly in 1993.

Walter Wolf was inducted into the Canadian Motorsport Hall of Fame in 1998.

In 2008, he was involved in the so-called Patria affair, a corruption scandal involving the Finnish company Patria. The Finnish broadcasting company YLE's investigative program MOT made claims that he was a mediator in the paying of bribes to Slovenian government officials, including Prime Minister Janez Janša. Both Wolf and Janša rejected all accusations as being untrue. Finnish police issued an arrest warrant against him, but so far he has not been apprehended.

Branded products
The Croatian tobacco company Adris grupa markets one of its cigarette brands as "Walter Wolf".
There were also perfumes marketed under the Walter Wolf name.

See also 
Walter Wolf Countach

References 

1939 births
Living people
Austrian emigrants to Canada
Canadian businesspeople
Formula One team owners
People from Maribor
Canadian motorsport people